Veenhuizen may refer to several places:
 Veenhuizen, North Holland
 Veenhuizen, Coevorden in the province of Drenthe
 Veenhuizen, Noordenveld in the province of Drenthe
 Veenhuizen, Menterwolde in the province of Groningen
 Veenhuizen, Stadskanaal in the province of Groningen